Chunshu Subdistrict is a subdistrict on the southerneast portion of Xicheng District, Beijing, China. As of 2020, its total population is 27,417.

The subdistrict got its current name due to  its abundance of Chinese mahogany in the area, which were already present during the Ming dynasty.

History

Administrative Division 
As of 2021, there are 7 communities under the Chunshu Subdistrict:

References 

Xicheng District
Subdistricts of Beijing